Armillaria heimii is a species of fungus in the family Physalacriaceae that is found in East Africa. It causes root rot in tea trees. The fungus was originally described as Clitocybe elegans by Roger Heim in 1963. David Pegler transferred it to the genus Armillaria in 1977.

See also
List of Armillaria species
List of tea diseases

References

heimii
Fungi of Africa
Fungal plant pathogens and diseases
Tea diseases
Fungi described in 1977